Frank Kane (July 19, 1912 – November 29, 1968) was an American author of detective fiction.

Biography
Kane was brought up in Brooklyn, New York. He attended St. John's Law School but had to leave his studies to support his spouse and newborn child. He worked as a columnist for The New York Press, as a letterer for the New York Trade Newspapers Corporation, for the New York Journal of Commerce, and in public relations, particularly as an advocate for the liquor industry. After World War II, he was a freelance writer, later working in radio, where he introduced movie stars, and in television.

Kane wrote for productions of The Shadow, Gang Busters, Counter Spy, The Fat Man, Casey, Crime Photographer, Mr. Keen, Tracer of Lost Persons, The Lawless Twenties, Nick Carter, Master Detective, and for the Coast Guard documentary You Have To Go Out. He created Call the Police for Lever Brothers and Claim Agent for NBC. From the 1940s through the 1960s, he wrote close to 40 novels (mostly centered around the character Johnny Liddell). He also wrote numerous short stories for crime magazines such as Manhunt, The Saint Detective Magazine, Private Eye, Pursuit.

He spent much of his in Hollywood, writing television dramas for the shows Special Agent 7 and The Investigators. He also wrote at least two dozen episodes of the television series Mike Hammer.

In 1960, his novel Key Witness was made into a feature film.

Works

 About Face (also titled: Death About Face) (also titled: The Fatal Foursome), (1947)
 Green Light For Death, (1949)
 Slay Ride, (1950)
 Bullet Proof, (1951)
 Dead Weight, (1951)
 Bare Trap, (1952)
 Poisons Unknown, (1953)
 Grave Danger, (1954)
 Red Hot Ice, (1955)
 Johnny Liddell's Morgue, (1956)
 Key Witness, (1956)
 A Real Gone Guy, (1956)
 Juke Box King, (1957)
 The Living End, (1957)
 Liz, (1958)
 Syndicate Girl, (1958)
 Trigger Mortis, (1958)
 The Line-Up, (1959)
 Trial By Fear, (1959)
 The Flesh Peddlers [written as: Frank BOYD], (1959)
 A Short Bier, (1960)
 Time To Prey, (1960)
 Johnny Staccato [written as: Frank BOYD], (1960)
 Due Or Die, (1961)
 The Mourning After, (1961)
 Stacked Deck, (1961)
 The Conspirators, (1962)
 Crime Of Their Live, (1962)
 Dead Rite, (1962)
 Hearse Class Male, (1963)
 Johnny Come Lately, (1963)
 Ring-A-Ding-Ding, (1963)
 Barely Seen, (1964)
 Fatal Undertaking, (1964)
 Final Curtain, (1964)
 The Guilt-Edged Frame, (1964)
 Esprit De Corpse, (1965)
 Two To Tangle, (1965)
 Maid In Paris, (1966)
 Margin For Terror, (1967)

Source:

References

External links
 
 

1912 births
1968 deaths
20th-century American novelists
American male novelists
People from New York City
20th-century American male writers